Ferrocarriles Chiapas-Mayab (reporting mark FCCM) is a state owned railroad in southeastern Mexico since 2016.

History
Ferrocarriles Chiapas-Mayab became a subsidiary of the Genesee & Wyoming in 1999 with a 30-year concession to operate the railroad. The railroad was damaged by Hurricane Stan in October 2005. The hurricane damaged over 175 miles of track and Genesee & Wyoming was not financially capable to repair the railroad. On June 25, 2007, Genesee & Wyoming Inc announced it was giving up its 30-year concession and liquidating FCCM SA by the end of 2007.  Operation of Ferrocarriles Chiapas-Mayab was officially taken over by Ferrocarril del Istmo de Tehuantepec in 2008. In 2012, Secretary of Communications and Transportation amended the railway concession in order to keep the railways under government control while allowing any potential investor to operate the cargo operations. By 2013, The Secretary of Communications and Transportation announced it had given the new amended concession to Viabilis Holdings to continue operations of Ferrocarriles Chiapas-Mayab for a period of 30–50 years.

Criticism
Employees who work for Ferrocarriles Chiapas-Mayab, as well as the SCT, have criticized management for the deterioration and lack of maintenance of railway infrastructure, citing the potential of petrochemical derailment and the loss of life. The Secretary General of the railway union of Yucatán, has criticized Ferrocarriles Chiapas-Mayab for the decline of speed from thirty-five kilometers per hour to ten kilometers per hour. The National Chamber of the transformation industry cited that the railway derails 200 times per year on average.

Loss of concession
By 2016, The Secretary of Communications and Transportation (SCT) grew impatient about the deterioration of the railroad, as well at the migrant crises in which Central American migrants were riding on top of the trains. By August 23, 2016, The Secretary of Communications and Transportation revoked the concession to Viabilis Holdings. Citing that, "For reasons of interest, public utility and national security" as the reason it was revoking the concession. Viabilis Holdings was given 60 days to remove and dispose of property, equipment and facilities owned off the railway.

One of the shareholders in Ferrocarriles Chiapas Mayab, Pedro Topete Vargas, denounced the revocation of its concession as, "an act of revenge" from Secretary of Communications and Transportation Ruiz Esparza. Due to litigation of his other company, Infraiber, towards SCT favorite OHL, which Vargas has accused of corruption and favoritism.

Railway rehabilitation
In September 2014, The Secretary of Telecommunications and Transportation announced that the federal government was going to invest 6 billion pesos to rehabilitate the railway in part to deter Central American Immigrants from hitch-hiking on the train, as well as to increase rail cargo speed in the region.

See also

Ferrocarriles Unidos del Sureste, predecessor
Ferrosur, operational successor
List of Mexican railroads

References

Railway companies of Mexico
Railway companies established in 1999
Railway companies disestablished in 2007
Railway companies established in 2014
Standard gauge railways in Mexico
Government-owned companies of Mexico
Genesee & Wyoming
Mexican companies established in 1999
Mexican companies established in 2014